Lieutenant-General Edmund Maine (20 January 1633 – 25 April 1711) was an English soldier and politician.

He was a Member of Parliament (MP) for Morpeth from 1705 to 1708.

He died aged 78.

References

|-

1633 births
1711 deaths
British Army generals
Members of the Parliament of Great Britain for English constituencies
English MPs 1705–1707
British MPs 1707–1708